Midecamycin is a macrolide antibiotic that is synthesized from Streptomyces mycarofaciens.

Physical Properties

Its melting point may vary depending on the compound type and the source consulted. For example, the Merck Index gives a melting point of 155-156 Celsius for the A1 type while the Japanese Pharmacopoeia reports 153-158 Celsius. The Merck Index also gives a melting point of 122-125 Celsius for the A3 type.

References 

Macrolide antibiotics
Secondary alcohols
Tertiary alcohols
Aldehydes
Dimethylamino compounds
Tetrahydropyrans
Propionate esters
Lactones